The 2010 Individual Ice Racing European Championship is the 2010 version of UEM Individual Ice Racing European Championship season. The final will be host in Ufa, Russia on 24 January 2010. The champion title was won by Russian rider Andrey Shishegov who in semi final started as track reserve and ride in three heat only. Silver medal was won by Sergej Karachintsev, Russian also. Third placed was won by Austrian rider Harald Simon who beat Semi Final winner Jounir Bazeev after Run-Off.

Qualifications

Semi-final 
January 23, 2010
 Ufa
City stadium “Stroitel” (Length: 340 m.)
Referee and Jury President:  Frank Ziegler
References 

(13)  British place replaced by Reserve No 18 Bogdanov
(16)  Grzegorz Knapp replaced by Pole Widera
(17)  Maxim Zacharow windraw
Nominated new track reserves:
No 17 ride in Heats 5 (Holstein), 12 (Bogdanov), 16 (Drozdov)
No 18 ride in Heats 9 (Goldi), 14 (Goldi), 20 (Goldi)

The Final 
January 24, 2010
 Ufa
City stadium “Stroitel” (Length: 340 m.)
Referee:  Frank Ziegler
Jury President:  Andrzej Grodzki
References  

(3)  Kai Lehtinen replaced by track reserve

See also 
 2010 Individual Ice Racing World Championship
 2010 Individual Junior Ice Racing European Championship
 Ice speedway

References 

Ice speedway competitions
European Individual